Dead by Dawn is an independent film festival in Edinburgh, Scotland. Dead by Dawn film festival is specifically devoted to horror films. Established in 1993 by Adele Hartley, it is a discovery festival showcasing mostly independent films, both short films and feature length films. Dead by Dawn is a former member of the European Fantastic Film Festivals Federation (EFFFF) and occurs once a year, usually in mid-April.

See also

Other genre film festivals
 Brussels International Festival of Fantasy Film
 European Fantastic Film Festivals Federation
 Fantafestival
 Fantasia Festival
 Festival de Cine de Sitges
 Fantastic Fest
 International Horror and Sci-Fi Film Festival
 New York City Horror Film Festival
 Toronto After Dark Film Festival
 TromaDance

Footnotes

External links
Official website
Interview in Netribution
SexGoreMutants.co.uk: Dead by Dawn 2000
Dead by Dawn on Edinburgh Festival Guide

Fantasy and horror film festivals in the United Kingdom
Film festivals in Edinburgh
Film festivals established in 1993